The Walpole Immaculate Conception is a c.1680 oil on canvas painting by Bartolomé Esteban Murillo. It is named after Robert Walpole, having formed part of his collection at Houghton Hall. It was acquired by Catherine the Great in 1779 with the rest of that collection and is now in the Hermitage Museum in Russia.

It was loaned back to Houghton Hall in 2013.

References

Paintings in the collection of the Hermitage Museum
1680s paintings
Paintings of the Immaculate Conception by Bartolomé Esteban Murillo
Angels in art